Encounters with Evil is a ten-episode British documentary television series that was released by CBS Reality in the United Kingdom in November 2016 and later in Poland and Africa. The show was released on Netflix in the United States. The series follows infamous killers.

Episodes

Episode 1 - Thrill Killers
 Focus: Dennis Nilsen, Ivan Milat, and Colin Ireland

Episode 2 - Psychopaths
 Focus: Joanna Dennehy, Peter Tobin, Ian Brady and Myra Hindley

Episode 3 - Imprisoners
 Focus: Wolfgang Přiklopil, Donald Neilson, Josef Fritzl, and Ariel Castro

Episode 4 - Prophets of Doom
 Focus: Jim Jones, Marshall Applewhite, and David Koresh

Episode 5 - Kidnap Killers
 Focus: Robert Black, Robert Thompson and Jon Venables, Bradley John Murdoch, Ian Huntley

Episode 6 - Family Killers
 Focus: Jeremy Bamber, Stuart Hazell, and Mitchell Quy

Episode 7 - Flesh Eaters
 Focus: Jeffrey Dahmer, Stephen Griffiths, and Armin Meiwes

Episode 8 - Spree Shooters
 Focus: Michael Ryan, Adam Lanza, Thomas Hamilton, Eric Harris and Dylan Klebold

Episode 9- Sex Slayers
 Focus: Fred West and Rosemary West, Steve Wright, and Peter Sutcliffe

Episode 10 - Murderous Medics
 Focus: Beverley Allitt, Josef Mengele, Myles Bradbury, and Harold Shipman

References

External links

Encounters with Evil on Netflix

2016 British television series debuts
2016 British television series endings
2010s British documentary television series
English-language television shows